Zamanabad (also Romanized as Zamānābād) is a village in Sahra Rural District, Anabad District, Bardaskan County, Razavi Khorasan Province, Iran. At the 2006 census, its population was 463, in 115 families.

References 

Populated places in Bardaskan County